The Giglistock is a mountain of the Urner Alps, located south of Gadmen in the Bernese Oberland.

References

External links
 Giglistock on Hikr
 photos

Mountains of the Alps
Mountains of Switzerland
Mountains of the canton of Bern
Two-thousanders of Switzerland